Good Chef Bad Chef is an Australian television cooking show. The "Good Chef" presents health conscious recipes, while the "Bad Chef" presents indulgent recipes. The show's presenters are Adrian Richardson and Preeya Alexander. 

Good Chef Bad Chef was originally hosted by Gary Mehigan and Janella Purcell on the Seven Network in 2006 and 2007.  

The series was picked up by Network Ten in 2011 with Adrian Richardson
 joining nutritionist Janella Purcell until 2012. Nutritionist Zoe Bingley-Pullin co-hosted from 2013 to 2017  and then Rosie Mansfield from 2018 to 2022 previously presented the healthy recipes, before they left the series. Preeya Alexander joined the show in 2022 and still currently hosts along side Richardson. Gary Mehigan previously present indulgent recipes on the Seven Network.

References

External links

Seven Network original programming
Network 10 original programming
Australian cooking television series
2006 Australian television series debuts
2007 Australian television series endings
2011 Australian television series debuts
English-language television shows
Australian television series revived after cancellation